Sabicea is a genus of flowering plants in the family Rubiaceae. They are known commonly as the woodvines. The type species is 
Sabicea cinerea. There are about 145 species. Most are distributed in tropical Africa and South America.

Species include:
Sabicea batesii
 Sabicea cinerea Aubl. – largeflower woodvine
 Sabicea medusula
 Sabicea pedicellata
 Sabicea pyramidalis L. Andersson
 Sabicea stenantha K.Krause
 Sabicea villosa Willd. ex Roem. & Schult. – woolly woodvine
 Sabicea xanthotricha Wernham

References

Further reading

External links
 
 
 

 

 
Rubiaceae genera
Taxonomy articles created by Polbot